George Henry Payne (August 13, 1876 - March 3, 1945) was an author and publisher. He was the campaign manager for Theodore Roosevelt in the United States presidential election of 1912.

Biography
He was born on August 13, 1876, in New York City to George Cooley Payne and Katherine Milligan. He attended City College of New York and then attended New York Law School in 1895.

Payne acted as campaign manager for Theodore Roosevelt in the presidential election of 1912. He was a member of the Federal Communications Commission from July 11, 1934 - June 30, 1943.

He died on March 3, 1945, in Hollis, New York.

Works
A Great Part, and Other Stories of the Stage, 1901
The Birth of the New Party, 1912 
History of the Child in Human Progress, 1915
History of Journalism in America, 1919
England-Her Treatment of America, 1931
The Fourth Estate and Radio, 1936

References

City College of New York alumni
New York Law School alumni
1876 births
1945 deaths
Members of the Federal Communications Commission
Franklin D. Roosevelt administration personnel